John Anthony Cornwell (born 13 October 1964) is an English former professional footballer who played in the Football League as a midfielder and defender, most notably for Leyton Orient and Southend United.

Career statistics

References

External links
 

English footballers
English Football League players
1964 births
Living people
Leyton Orient F.C. players
Newcastle United F.C. players
Swindon Town F.C. players
Southend United F.C. players
Cardiff City F.C. players
Brentford F.C. players
Northampton Town F.C. players
Association football midfielders